Gerard or Gérard is a given name and a surname.

Gerard may also refer to:

Music
 Gerard (band), a Japanese progressive rock band
 Gerard, a Colorado band fronted by Gerard McMahon
 Gerard (album), an album by Gerard

Places
 Gerard Bluffs, ice-free bluffs in the Miller Range in Antarctica
 Gerard, South Australia
 Gerard Community Council, a local government area
 Gerard (crater), a lunar crater

Titles
 Baron Gerard, a peerage of the United Kingdom
 Gerard baronets, three baronetcies

Other uses
 Hotel Gerard, a hotel in New York City

See also
 Gerardia (disambiguation), a genus of flowering plants